Lely Berlitt Burgos Ortiz (born June 6, 1985) is a Puerto Rican weightlifter. She competed at the 2012 Summer Olympics in the Women's 48 kg, finishing in 11th place.

References

External links

Puerto Rican female weightlifters

Living people
Olympic weightlifters of Puerto Rico
Weightlifters at the 2012 Summer Olympics
Weightlifters at the 2016 Summer Olympics
1985 births
Pan American Games gold medalists for Puerto Rico
Pan American Games medalists in weightlifting
Central American and Caribbean Games silver medalists for Puerto Rico
Central American and Caribbean Games bronze medalists for Puerto Rico
Weightlifters at the 2015 Pan American Games
Competitors at the 2010 Central American and Caribbean Games
Central American and Caribbean Games medalists in weightlifting
Medalists at the 2011 Pan American Games
20th-century Puerto Rican women
21st-century Puerto Rican women